Manolo García (born in Xàtiva), a.k.a. Manuel García, is a Spanish make-up artist. He was nominated for the Goya Award for Best Make-Up and Hairstyles four times, and won the award for his work in The Sea Inside (2004). The latter film also earned him an Academy Award for Best Makeup nomination.

External links

References

Year of birth missing (living people)
Living people
People from Xàtiva
Spanish make-up artists